Desiré-Raoul Rochette (March 6, 1790 – July 3, 1854), was a French archaeologist.

Born at Saint-Amand in the department of Cher, Raoul Rochette received his education at Bourges. In 1810, he obtained a chair of grammar in the Lyceum Louis-le-Grand.  He was made professor of history in the College of Louis-le-Grand at Paris in 1813 and in the Sorbonne in 1817. His first major work was Histoire critique de l'établissement des colonies grecques (4 vols., 1815).

He was superintendent of antiquities in the Bibliothèque at Paris from 1819 to 1848, and professor of archaeology at the Bibliothèque from 1826, a result of which may be seen in his Cours d'archéologie (1828). In 1829 he published his Monuments inédits, with his Peintures inédites following in 1836 and his Peintures de Pompei in 1844. He contributed to the Annali of the Roman Institute, the Journal des savants and the Académie des Inscriptions et Belles-Lettres.

He was elected a member of the American Antiquarian Society in 1838. At his death on 3 July 1854 Rochette was perpetual secretary of the Academy of Fine Arts and a corresponding member of most of the learned societies in Europe.

References

External links
 Pictures and texts of Lettres sur la Suisse by Desiré-Raoul Rochette can be found in the database VIATIMAGES.

1790 births
1854 deaths
People from Cher (department)
Academic staff of the University of Paris
French archaeologists
Members of the Académie des Inscriptions et Belles-Lettres
Members of the American Antiquarian Society